Don't Worry, the Doors Will Open is a Ukrainian-Canadian documentary film, directed by Oksana Karpovych and released in 2019. The film centres on the Soviet-era electrichka trains that are still in operation in and around Kyiv, and the poor and working-class commuters who still use them on a regular basis.

The film premiered at the 2019 Montreal International Documentary Festival, where it won the New Vision Award. In 2020 it was screened at the Hot Docs Canadian International Documentary Festival and at DocuDays UA in Ukraine.

The film was a nominee for the Directors Guild of Canada's DGC Discovery Award in 2020.

References

External links

2019 films
2019 documentary films
Canadian documentary films
Ukrainian documentary films
Documentary films about Ukraine
Documentary films about transport
2010s Canadian films